USS Milan (YP‑6) was a 75-foot patrol boat which served in the United States Coast Guard as Onondago (WCG-209) until transferred to the United States Navy. The ship was built in 1925 by Kingston Drydock and Construction Company of Kingston, New York.

Service history
Placed in Navy service on 11 December 1933, she was renamed USS Skaneateles on 1 June 1934 before being renamed USS Milan on 20 October 1937.  The Milan was rechristened by Mrs. Charles Edison, wife of the Assistant Secretary of the Navy and daughter-in-law of Thomas Edison. The name is in reference the village in Ohio, Edison's birthplace.

After her rechristening as USS Milan, (YP-6), a former district patrol vessel, was tied up at the Washington Navy Yard for the use of the Assistant Secretary of the Navy. With the outbreak of World War II, she was returned to patrol duties. In the middle of the war she was loaned, for a brief period, to the dock department, City of New York, after which she returned to the Washington, D.C., area, stationed at Dahlgren, Virginia. Declared to be excess to the needs of the Navy on 5 April 1946, Milan was turned over to War Shipping Administration for disposal on 7 July 1946 and sold on 27 July 1946.

References

 
 

Ships of the United States Coast Guard
Yard patrol boats of the United States Navy
Ships built in Kingston, New York
1925 ships